Márcio Gualberto dos Santos (Recife, November 15, 1976) is an inspector of the Civil Police and Brazilian state deputy member of the Social Liberal Party from Rio de Janeiro. In the elections of 2018, Gualberto was elected deputy with 23,169 votes, with his expense of 3,288.98 reais, setting the best relation between number of votes and campaign expenses, with 14 cents per voter.

Personal life

Gualberto is Roman Catholic, married with four children. Due to his faith he is against abortion.

Like the elected federal deputy Chris Tonietto, he is connected to the Center Dom Bosco.

References

External links
 
 Márcio Gualberto on Instagram
 Márcio Gualberto on Twitter

1976 births
Living people
Brazilian Roman Catholics
Politicians from Recife
Members of the Legislative Assembly of Rio de Janeiro
Social Liberal Party (Brazil) politicians